Sydney Evershed (c. 1825 – 1903) was an English brewer and Liberal Party politician who represented Burton.

Evershed's family came from Albury in Surrey. By 1860 he had moved to Burton-on-Trent, and became a Burton brewer. He lived at Stapenhill, where he built Albury House, named after his birthplace.
Evershed was active in local politics and was one of the Improvement Commissioners, and one of the first councillors when Burton was incorporated as a borough in 1878. In 1886, he was elected as Member of Parliament for Burton which he held until 1900. He died at Marylebone in 1903.

Evershed married Fanny Whitehead at Marylebone in 1856. Their sons Sydney, Wallis, Frank and Edward all played cricket for Derbyshire. Fanny died in 1904. In 1909 his brewery merged with Marston and Thompson to become Marston, Thompson and Evershed.

References

1825 births
1903 deaths
English brewers
Liberal Party (UK) MPs for English constituencies
UK MPs 1886–1892
UK MPs 1892–1895
UK MPs 1895–1900
19th-century English businesspeople